Howesville is an unincorporated community in Lewis Township, Clay County, Indiana. It is part of the Terre Haute Metropolitan Statistical Area.

History
Howesville was laid out in 1856. A post office was established in Howesville in 1858, and remained in operation until it was discontinued in 1909.

Geography

References

Unincorporated communities in Clay County, Indiana
Unincorporated communities in Indiana
Terre Haute metropolitan area